Oliver Custodio Da Costa (born 10 February 1995) is a Swiss footballer who plays for Lausanne-Sport as a defensive midfielder.

Career
On 31 August 2013, Custodio made his professional debut with FC Lausanne-Sport in a 2013–14 Swiss Super League match against FC Thun replacing Salim Khelifi (90th minute).

In the summer of 2017, he was transferred to FC Luzern. On 18 June 2019, he signed a three-year deal with FC Lugano. On 15 May 2022, Custodio scored a goal in Lugano's 4–1 victory over St. Gallen in the final of the Swiss Cup.

On 11 June 2022, Custodio returned to Lausanne-Sport.

Honours
Lugano
Swiss Cup: 2021–22

References

External links

1995 births
Swiss people of Portuguese descent
People from Montreux
Sportspeople from the canton of Vaud
Living people
Swiss men's footballers
Switzerland youth international footballers
Switzerland under-21 international footballers
Association football midfielders
FC Lausanne-Sport players
FC Luzern players
FC Lugano players
2. Liga Interregional players
Swiss 1. Liga (football) players
Swiss Super League players
Swiss Challenge League players